Poison Friends is a 2006 French drama film directed by Emmanuel Bourdieu.

Cast 
 Malik Zidi - Eloi Duhaut
 Thibault Vinçon - André Morney
  - Alexandre Pariente
 Thomas Blanchard - Edouard Franchon
 Dominique Blanc - Florence Duhaut
 Natacha Régnier - Marguerite
 Jacques Bonnaffé - Professeur Mortier

References

External links 

2006 drama films
2006 films
French drama films
Films directed by Emmanuel Bourdieu
2000s French films